Galo Lincoln Plaza Lasso de la Vega (17 February 1906 – 28 January 1987) was an Ecuadorian statesman who served as President of Ecuador from 1948 to 1952 and Secretary General of the Organization of American States from 1968 to 1975. He is the son of former Ecuadorian President Leonidas Plaza.

Early life
Plaza was born in New York City in 1906 at the Marlton House during the exile of his father, the general and ex-president Leónidas Plaza; his mother was Avelina Lasso Ascásubi. In Quito, he completed his secondary school at the Instituto Nacional Mejía. Then, he studied agriculture at the University of Maryland, economics at the University of California, Berkeley, and diplomacy at the Edmund A. Walsh School of Foreign Service at Georgetown University.

Career
In 1938, Plaza was appointed the Minister of War of Ecuador. In 1940, he founded the Colegio Americano de Quito. In 1944, he was appointed as Ecuador's Ambassador to the U.S. In 1948, after forming a liberal political group in Ecuador, he was elected President of Ecuador.

Presidency
Galo Plaza differed from previous Ecuadorian presidents. The son of former President Leónidas Plaza, he had been born in the United States, where he also attended several universities. His ties to the United States grew even closer as a result of serving there as ambassador under President Carlos Alberto Arroyo del Río. These links, as Pike points out, "rendered him vulnerable to charges by Velasco Ibarra and other demagogic opponents of being the lackey of U.S. imperialism."

Galo Plaza brought a developmentalist and technocratic emphasis to Ecuadorian government. He invited a wide variety of foreign experts in economic development and in governmental administration to recommend and catalog reforms in both areas. In large part because of a lack of political will within either the executive or the legislature, however, virtually none of the recommended reforms was enacted. Nevertheless, the economy experienced a marked improvement, with inflation finally slowing down and both government budget and foreign currency accounts balancing for the first time in many years. This achievement was even more remarkable in light of the series of major earthquakes, landslides, and floods suffered by Ecuador in 1949 and 1950.

No doubt Galo Plaza's most important contribution to Ecuadorian political culture was his commitment to the principles and practices of democracy. Galo Plaza endorsed such democratic guarantees as freedom of the press and the freedom of opponents to voice their opinions, to assemble for political purposes without fear of being jailed or worse, and to be elected to the legislature without fear of being defrauded or arbitrarily dismissed. Galo Plaza was able to create a mystique around the idea of his completing his term in office, something no president had accomplished since 1924, and this mystique no doubt helped him achieve his goal.

As Galo Plaza readily admitted, however, his greatest asset, both politically and economically, was the onset of the nation's banana boom, as diseases plaguing plantations in Central America turned Ecuador into an alternative supplier to the huge United States market. Ecuador's banana exports grew from US$2 million to US$20 million between 1948 and 1952. During these years, Ecuador also benefited from sizable price increases—generated by the Korean War—for its commodity exports.

As president he managed to foment the agricultural exports of Ecuador during his government, creating economic stability. During his presidency, an earthquake near Ambato severely damaged the city and surrounding areas and killed approximately 8,000 people. Unable to succeed himself, he left his office in 1952 as the first president in 28 years to complete his term in office. He ran again in the election of 1960, but was defeated by José Maria Velasco Ibarra.

After leaving office, he held a number of diplomatic posts for the United Nations. He was a mediator in the conflicts in Lebanon (1958), the Congo (1960) and Cyprus (1964–1965). In 1968, he became the Secretary General of the OAS, where he gained a reputation for leadership.

Galo Plaza owned a large hacienda and cattle ranch Zuleta near Quito, where he customarily spent weekends throughout his four years as president. During the later 1950s and into the 1960s, the former president instituted educational and landholding reforms for the benefit of the numerous workers there.

Inter-American Dialogue
In 1982 Galo Plaza together with the U.S. diplomat Sol M. Linowitz formed the Inter-American Dialogue think tank with the goal of bringing together leaders of the Americas to set a new inter-American agenda.

Notable Offspring
Galo Plaza had many great-grandchildren. Three of the more notable great-grandchildren of Galo Plaza are Cayetana, Santiago, and Martin. Their last names have been redacted for their privacy.
Cayetana is a technology founder and latina leader in technology, Santiago is a Phi Beta Kappa member at Dartmouth College, and Martin works at TEK Systems, he is their top help desk recruiter.

Death
Galo Plaza died of a heart attack 28 January 1987 in a hospital in Quito. He was survived by his wife, Rosario Pallares, and his five daughters and one son.

References

External links

Galo Plaza's biography at the Ecuadorian government's website 
Plaza's obituary in the NY Times

1906 births
1987 deaths
Politicians from New York City
Presidents of Ecuador
Government ministers of Ecuador
Ambassadors of Ecuador to the United States
Secretaries General of the Organization of American States
Walsh School of Foreign Service alumni
University of Maryland, College Park alumni
University of California, Berkeley alumni
Georgetown University alumni
Children of national leaders
American people of Ecuadorian descent
American emigrants to Ecuador